Annette Summers Engel is an American earth scientist who is Donald and Florence Jones Professor of Aqueous Geochemistry at the University of Tennessee. Her research considers how microbes interact with rocks and minerals. She was elected Fellow of the American Association for the Advancement of Science in 2019.

Early life and education 
Engel is from Ohio. Whilst at summer camp at Carter Caves State Resort Park, Engel realised she wanted to be a geologist. She met Horton H. Hobbs Jr., a member of the Wittenberg University Speleological Society. She eventually became an undergraduate student in geology at the Wittenberg University, where she spent her weekends doing field work. During one of her adventures she became aware of the Movile Cave ecosystems, and was eventually offered a position on the research team in Romania. She stayed in Ohio for her graduate studies, and completed her Master's dissertation on the Movile Cave at the University of Cincinnati. She remained at the University of Cincinnati for a second master's degree, focusing on biology. Alongside her work on the Movile Cave, Engel studied the Frasassi Caves. She was a doctoral researcher at the University of Texas at Austin, where she studied geochemistry and geomicrobiology. Her doctoral research focused on the Lower Kane Cave in Wyoming. She identified a novel group of sulphur bacteria, which were closely related to bacteria found in deep sea hydrothermal vents. She was the first to identify that microorganisms were involved with sulfuric acid speleogenesis.

Research and career 
Engel investigates how microbes interact with rocks and minerals. She joined the faculty at Louisiana State University in 2004. Her early research involved the Edwards Aquifer, as well as research into the microbial diversity of salt marshes. Alongside caves, Engel worked on coastal systems, particularly focusing on how ecosystems were impacted by the Deepwater Horizon oil spill.

In 2011, Engel moved to the University of Tennessee. She was appointed the Donald and Florence Jones Professor of Aqueous Geochemistry in 2016. She has investigated the biological diversity of lava tubes in Hawaii. In addition, she studied lucinid bivalves from coastal biomes, and how changes in the coastal biome will impact lucinid chemosymbiotic associations. She was elected President of the International Society for Environmental Biogeochemistry in 2020.

Awards and honors 

 1996 National Speleological Society James G. Mitchell award 
 1997 Charles A. and Anne Morrow Lindbergh Foundation award
 2003 Elected Fellow of the National Speleological Society
 2012 Elected Fellow of the Geological Society of America
 2014 National Speleological Society Science Award 
 2015 Elected Fellow of The Explorers Club
 2019 Elected Fellow of the American Association for the Advancement of Science
 2021 Karst Waters Institute Karst Award

Selected publications

References 

Living people
Year of birth missing (living people)
American earth scientists
University of Cincinnati alumni
Wittenberg University alumni
University of Texas at Austin alumni
Louisiana State University faculty
University of Tennessee faculty
Fellows of the American Association for the Advancement of Science